James Alexander Dudley Richards (March 22, 1845 – December 4, 1911) was an American lawyer and politician who served as a U.S. Representative from Ohio for one term from 1893 to 1895.

Early life and career 
Richards was born in Boston, Massachusetts, and spent his early life there and in New York City, where he received a common-school education.
He moved to New Philadelphia, Ohio, in 1861.
He studied law.
He was admitted to the bar in 1867 and commenced practice in New Philadelphia.

Congress 
Richards was elected as a Democrat to the Fifty-third Congress (March 4, 1893 – March 3, 1895).
He served as chairman of the Committee on Expenditures in the Post Office Department (Fifty-third Congress).
He was an unsuccessful candidate for reelection in 1894 to the Fifty-fourth Congress.

Later career
He resumed the practice of law in Washington, D.C., and subsequently returned to New Philadelphia, Ohio, and continued the practice of his profession.

Death
He died in New Philadelphia, on December 4, 1911.
He was interred in the East Fair Street Cemetery.

Sources

1845 births
1911 deaths
Politicians from Boston
People from New Philadelphia, Ohio
Ohio lawyers
19th-century American politicians
19th-century American lawyers
Democratic Party members of the United States House of Representatives from Ohio